Visitors to Ukraine must obtain a visa from one of the Ukrainian diplomatic missions or online, unless they come from one of the visa-exempt countries.

Visa policy map

Visa exemption 

Holders of passports (or national ID cards, where allowed) of the following 82 jurisdictions can enter Ukraine without a visa for a stay up to the duration listed below. Some nationals are required to provide additional documents or proof of sufficient funds in order to be granted visa-free entry, depending on nationality.

ID - May enter with a national ID card (in card format) if arriving directly from the country of nationality.
A - Must hold proof of sufficient funds on arrival.
B - Visa not required for service, tourist and private trips, provided that documents certifying the purpose of the trip (e.g. tourist voucher or invitation letter) are presented to the Ukrainian immigration officer.
C - Very often, citizens of this country (mostly men of military age and sometimes suspicious-looking women) are denied entry for reasons of national security or without any explanation at all.
D - Temporary policy until 30 January 2024.

Non-ordinary passports
Additionally, only holders of diplomatic or official/service passports of Cuba, Dominican Republic, Egypt, Indonesia, Iran, Laos, Morocco, Peru, Singapore, Sri Lanka, Thailand, Tunisia, Turkmenistan, Venezuela and Vietnam and only diplomatic passports of India and Mexico do not require a visa for Ukraine.

Electronic visas

Ukraine introduced electronic visas on 4 April 2018. Visas are valid for tourism and business purposes for 30 days and cost US$85. From 1 January 2019, electronic visas will also be available for the following purposes: treatment, activities in the field of culture, science, education, sports, in order to perform official duties of a foreign correspondent or representative of a foreign media.

Starting November 1, 2020 visa cost will be reduced to US$20 for visa with single entry and US$30 for double-entry visa with  decision within 3 business days. Urgent visa processing will be available for double visa fee (US$40/60) and decision within 1 business day.

Nationalities eligible for e-Visas are as follows:

Due to the Russo-Ukrainian War, e-Visa service is currently suspended.

Visa on arrival 
The visa-on-arrival facility was terminated on 1 January 2019. Previously, holders of passports of eligible countries could enter Ukraine by obtaining a visa on arrival at Kyiv Boryspil Airport, Kyiv International Airport (Zhuliany) and Odesa International Airport for a stay up to 15 days.

Crimea
The Autonomous Republic of Crimea was annexed by Russian Federation after its military intervention of 2014. 
On 4 June 2015, the Government of Ukraine has adopted the resolution No. 367 "About the statement of the Order of entrance on temporarily occupied territory of Ukraine and departure from the territory". According to the document, entrance of foreigners and persons without citizenship on temporarily occupied territory of Ukraine and departure from the territory is carried out through checkpoints according to passport documents and the special permission given by territorial authority, which, however, is not issued to regular visitors. You may only legally enter Crimea from mainland Ukraine.
Entrance into Crimea by any other entry point other than from mainland Ukraine, such as air, sea, or the Kerch Strait Bridge is illegal. You will be denied entry into mainland Ukraine and banned from entering Ukraine for five years.
Time spent in Crimea will count against the 90 day visa-free period.

Donetsk and Luhansk regions
Parts of Donetsk and Luhansk regions are under de facto control of pro-Russian  paramilitary forces, the self-proclaimed Donetsk People's Republic and Luhansk People's Republic. These parts of country are declared an Anti-Terrorist Operation Zone. In November 2014, the Government of Ukraine imposed passport control on all persons entering or leaving this territory. Ukrainian citizens have to show their passports while foreigners also have to explain the purpose of their visit. Arrival through checkpoints on uncontrolled parts of the Russia–Ukraine border are against the law, and visitors will not be able to proceed further into Ukraine. Entering Ukraine through the area of armed conflict is a violation of Ukrainian law. U.S. citizens who enter Ukraine illegally through the area of armed conflict along the Russian border will not be allowed to pass through government checkpoints to territory controlled by the government of Ukraine. Ukraine's Security Service (SBU) procedures at entry/exit points require that permit applications be submitted and approved electronically prior to travel in the zone of armed conflict. Foreigners who enter Ukraine from Russia through a separatist-controlled checkpoint at Donetsk or Luhansk won't be allowed through any government-controlled checkpoints that follow.

Fingerprinting

Ukraine introduced biometric control (fingerprints, digital photo) at border crossings for nationals of the following 70 countries on 1 January 2018:
Afghanistan, Algeria, Angola, Bangladesh, Benin, Botswana, Burkina Faso, Burundi, Cameroon, Cape Verde, Central African Republic, Chad, Comoros, Congo, DR Congo, Côte d'Ivoire, Djibouti, Egypt, Equatorial Guinea, Eritrea, Eswatini, Ethiopia, Gabon, Gambia, Ghana, Guinea, Guinea-Bissau, Guyana, Iran, Iraq, Jordan, Kenya, Kyrgyzstan, Lebanon, Lesotho, Liberia, Libya, Madagascar, Malawi, Mali, Mauritania, Morocco, Mozambique, Namibia, Niger, Nigeria, North Korea, Pakistan, Palestine, Papua New Guinea, Russia, Rwanda, São Tomé and Príncipe, Senegal, Sierra Leone, Somalia, South Sudan, Sri Lanka, Sudan, Syria, Tajikistan, Tanzania, Togo, Tonga, Tunisia, Uganda, Vietnam, Yemen, Zambia, Zimbabwe.

Visa policy towards citizens of the Russian Federation 
On 1 July 2022 Ukraine introduced an unilateral visa regime with Russia. Russia did not introduce a visa regime with Ukraine. Since the diplomatic missions of Ukraine (embassies, general and honorary consulates, ordinary consulates) in Russian cities were closed when Ukraine severed all formal diplomatic ties with Russia (following the 24 February 2022 Russian full-scale invasion of Ukraine) Russian citizens living in Russia must apply to commercial visa centers that will operate only in a few Russian cities to obtain a Ukrainian visa. Those Russian citizens who are outside of Russia should apply for a visa at one of the diplomatic missions of Ukraine in other countries of the world.

The Ukrainian and Russian services of Radio Liberty found out that even obtaining a Ukrainian visa by a Russian citizen does not guarantee and does not mean his admission to the territory of Ukraine. Ukrainian border guards are ordered to leave admission or refusal of entry at their discretion (if a person seems suspicious to him or if he cannot answer the border guard's questions reliably) even to holders of a valid Ukrainian visa.

On 1 August 2022 the State Border Guard Service of Ukraine stated that about 80 Russians had submitted documents for obtaining a Ukrainian visa.

On 13 December 2022 the State Border Guard Service of Ukraine stated that during the first 4.5 months of the visa regime 10 visas were issued to Russian citizens and seven Russian citizens had entered Ukraine (mostly for humanitarian reasons).

Future plans
 Ukrainian government considered the possibility of introducing visa regime with the United Kingdom. 
 The MFA of Ukraine announced that it is possible that it will cancel visa-free regime for Israel as a reaction to frequent causeless denials of entry for Ukrainian citizens by Israeli border guards in Ben Gurion Airport (especially the case, when a whole plane of 140 people was denied entry with no explanations), as well as systematic violations of rights of Ukrainian citizens in Israel.
Ukrainian government intends to sign reciprocal visa-free deals with the following states in the next five years: China, Costa Rica, El Salvador, Guatemala, Jamaica, Mauritius, Nauru, Palau, Peru, Samoa, and Solomon Islands.

Reciprocity

Ukrainian citizens can enter most of the countries whose citizens are granted visa-free access to Ukraine without a visa but they require a visa for Australia, Bahrain, Canada, Japan, Kuwait, New Zealand, Oman, Saudi Arabia, South Korea, United Kingdom and the United States.

Visitor statistics
Most visitors arriving to Ukraine were from the following countries of nationality:

See also

Visa requirements for Ukrainian citizens
Foreign policy of Ukraine
Ministry of Foreign Affairs (Ukraine)
State Border Guard Service of Ukraine

References

External links
eVisa of Ukraine. Ministry of Foreign Affairs

Ukraine
Foreign relations of Ukraine